Tom Stevenson (born 1951) is a British wine writer and critic. Described by his colleagues as one of today's most prolific wine authors, Stevenson is regarded as the world's leading authority on Champagne. He has written 23 books, the most important of which have been published internationally by more than 50 publishers and translated into over 25 languages.  In 1986, his book Champagne became the first wine book to win four literary awards, establishing Stevenson's reputation as a serious author, a fastidious researcher with a talent for divining future issues, and a critic bold enough to take on the establishment.

Career
Although Stevenson's first writings on wine were published in Decanter in the late 1970s, a magazine for which he still writes, he was a more prolific contributor to WINE Magazine for consumers and Wine & Spirit International for the trade (both since merged into Wine & Spirit) during the 1980s and 1990s.  At the time he was known for his monthly "Fizz File" column in WINE Magazine, and for being the author of the award winning annual Champagne supplements for both of these magazines.

In 1998, his Christie's World Encyclopedia of Champagne & Sparkling Wine became the only wine book to warrant a leader in a UK national newspaper (The Guardian, 14 October 1998), when he published for the first time a 17th-century document proving that the English used a second fermentation to convert still wines into sparkling at least six years before Dom Pérignon arrived at the Abbey of Hautvillers, and almost 40 years before the French claim that sparkling Champagne was invented.

Stevenson is regarded as one of the world's leading experts on Alsace wine. In 1987 he was elected a confrère oenophile of the Confrérie Saint Etienne, when he was the sole person amongst the Alsace wine producers and other experts present to identify a 50-year-old wine made from Sylvaner. In 1994 Stevenson's 600-page The Wines of Alsace won the Veuve Clicquot Book of the Year award in the United States and caused Malcolm Gluck, then wine correspondent of  The Guardian, to declare that "It is not simply the best book about Alsace wines ever written, or the most penetrating book about a French wine region ever written; it is the greatest wine book ever written, period".

Stevenson is the author of several more wide-ranging publications, including The Sotheby's Wine Encyclopedia, which is required reading for both Master of Wine and Master Sommelier examinations, and has been published and revised continuously since 1988. In this book, Stevenson has shown that he has the gift of taking vast quantities of knowledge and experience and translating them into lucid, sparkling prose, easily graspable by the novice, yet still interesting and instructive to the connoisseur. With The Oxford Companion to Wine, The Sotheby's Wine Encyclopedia is regarded as one of the essential wine reference books in English.

In addition to the books authored by Stevenson, he conceived and edited the annual Wine Report, described by Jancis Robinson as "the most significant entirely new wine book to emerge in 2003". In August 2009 it was announced by publisher Dorling Kindersley that the 2009 edition of Wine Report was to be the last, citing that the sales figures were insufficient to justify the fees of the guide's 45 writers, among them Clive Coates and Anthony Rose. Wine Report was the recipient of "Best in World" prizes three times at the Gourmand International Awards, and in 2006 it became the only wine book to be inducted into Gourmand's Hall of Fame (a feat unmatched by other wine books until 2007 when joined by The World Atlas of Wine and Bordeaux et ses Vins).

Over and above these awards, Stevenson has personally won 31 literary prizes, including "Wine writer of the year" three times and the Wine Literary Award, America's lifetime achievement award for wine writing.

Stevenson has been chairman of Champagne and Alsace panels at the "Decanter World Wine Awards" since its inception, and has judged at other major competitions in France, Germany, Greece, Australia and the U.S. He presents the Christie's Champagne Masterclass in London every year (taking it to Singapore one year). He sporadically writes at wine-pages.com,  and once away an entire edition of his Champagne & Sparkling Wine Guide simply because it was late coming out. His Aromas and Flavors resource lists the active chemical compounds responsible for common aromas in wine and has been described as the most helpful tool for delineating wine's attributes since Dr. Anne Noble's Aroma Wheel was devised at UC Davis in 1990.

Selected publications

See also
 Richard Juhlin: Swedish writer focusing on Champagne, one of the leading Champagne connoisseurs in the world.
List of wine personalities

References

External links
 Tom Stevenson, Columnist, Tom Cannavan's wine-pages.com

1951 births
British male journalists
Living people
Wine critics
Wine writers
People from Royal Tunbridge Wells